Neuhofen an der Krems is a municipality in the district Linz-Land in the Austrian state of Upper Austria.

Geography
Neuhofen lies in the middle of the triangle formed by the cities of Linz, Wels, and Steyr. About 10 percent of the municipality is forest, and 75 percent is farmland.

Personalities
It is the birthplace of Georg von Derfflinger.

References

Cities and towns in Linz-Land District